Korona Peak is a mountain in the Kyrgyz Ala-Too Range of the Tian Shan. It is located in Ala Archa National Park in Kyrgyzstan. It is named for its crown-like appearance.

Ak-Sai Glacier lies on its southwest flank.

References

Mountains of Kyrgyzstan
Chüy Region
Four-thousanders of the Tian Shan
Mountains of Ala Archa National Park